International rankings of Guyana

Demographics

List of countries by population ranked 162
List of countries by suicide rate ranked 1

Economy

Heritage Foundation/Wall Street Journal 2012 Index of Economic Freedom ranked 137

Environment
New Economics Foundation 2012 Happy Planet Index ranked 31

Politics

Transparency International 2011 Corruption Perceptions Index ranked 134

References

Guyana